Hossein Hang Afarin (1878 – 1952) was a Persian (Iranian) band conductor of the Cossack Brigade, conductor of Okhovvat society  orchestra, and performer of setar. Studied military music under the French musician Monsieur Lemaire and Persian classical music under Mirza Abdollah. He is regarded by Ruhollah Khaleqi as an accomplished musician and setar performer of his time. Aside from leading the Brigade bands he taught setar, violin, and piano privately. He is credited for creating many famous musicians such as Nasrollah Zarrin Panjeh 
(), Reza Mahjubi and Morteza Mahjubi.

References 

Persian musicians
1878 births
1952 deaths
Place of birth missing
Date of birth missing
Date of death missing